Karol Csányi (born January 24, 1991) is a Slovak-Hungarian professional ice hockey winger currently playing for HKM Zvolen of the Slovak Extraliga.

He previously played two games for Lev Poprad of the Kontinental Hockey League (KHL) during the 2011–12 season.

Career statistics

Regular season and playoffs

References

External links
 

1991 births
Living people
HC Lev Poprad players
HK Nitra players
Hungarian ice hockey forwards
Slovak ice hockey forwards
KRS Heilongjiang players
Újpesti TE (ice hockey) players
DVTK Jegesmedvék players
HKM Zvolen players
Sportspeople from Komárno
Hungarian expatriate sportspeople in the Czech Republic
Slovak expatriate ice hockey players in the Czech Republic
Hungarian expatriate ice hockey people
Slovak expatriate ice hockey players in the United States
Slovak expatriate ice hockey players in Sweden
Expatriate ice hockey players in China
Slovak expatriate sportspeople in China
Hungarian expatriate sportspeople in China
Hungarian expatriate sportspeople in the United States
Hungarian expatriate sportspeople in Sweden